Cra$h & Burn is a Canadian television drama series created by Malcolm MacRury. The show takes place in Hamilton, Ontario, Canada, where it is also filmed.

The series stars Luke Kirby as Jimmy Burn, a claims investigator for Protected Insurance.

Characters

Main cast members

External links

 Cra$h and Burn
 

2000s Canadian drama television series
2009 Canadian television series debuts
2009 Canadian television series endings
Showcase (Canadian TV channel) original programming
Global Television Network original programming
Television shows set in Hamilton, Ontario
Television shows filmed in Hamilton, Ontario
Television series by Corus Entertainment
Works about the Russian Mafia